This is a list of government-owned companies of the United Arab Emirates.  A Government-owned corporation is a legal entity that undertakes commercial activities on behalf of an owner government. Their legal status varies from being a part of government to stock companies with a state as a regular stockholder. There is no standard definition of a government-owned corporation (GOC) or state-owned enterprise (SOE), although the two terms can be used interchangeably. The defining characteristics are that they have a distinct legal form and they are established to operate in commercial affairs. While they may also have public policy objectives, GOCs should be differentiated from other forms of government agencies or state entities established to pursue purely non-financial objectives.

Government-owned companies of the United Arab Emirates

  Aabar Investments
  Abu Dhabi Investment Council
  Abu Dhabi Ports Company
  Abu Dhabi Terminals
  Abu Dhabi National Oil Company
  Arab Media Group
  Arabian Television Network
  Creative City
  Daman, National Health Insurance Company
  DP World
  Dubai Holding
  Dubai Inc.
  Dubai Internet City
  Dubai Knowledge Village
  Dubai Lifestyle City
  Dubai Media City
  Dubai Royal Air Wing
  Dubai Silicon Oasis
  Dubai World
  Dubai World Central - Al Maktoum International Airport
  Dubailand
  EDGE Group
  Electronic Documents Centre
  Emirates Credit Information Company(Emcredit)
  Emirates (airline)
  Emirates National Oil Company
  Emirates Global Aluminium
  Emirates Post
  Empower Energy Solutions
  Etihad Airways
  Etihad Credit Insurance
  Fly Dubai
  Green Crescent Insurance Company (GCC)
  International Petroleum Investment Company
  Investment Corporation of Dubai (ICD)
  Kizad
  Leisurecorp
  Majan
  Mubadala Investment Company
  Presidential Flight (UAE)
  Ras Al Khaimah IT Park
  Ras Al Khaimah Media Free Zone
  SHOOFtv
  Tatweer

See also

 Jebel Ali Free Zone
 List of free Trade Zones in Dubai
 List of Free Trade Zones in UAE
 List of government-owned companies
 Lists of companies (category}
 State ownership

References

Bibliography
 .  Alternate location:

Government-owned
United Arab Emirates